The Escondido Union School District (EUSD) is a school district that serves the city of Escondido, California. The district serves over 17,000 elementary and middle school students with a student to teacher ratio of 19.6 to 1. The district contains 5 middle schools, 17 elementary schools, and one specialty school.

Escondido Union School District's website: http://www.eusd.org 

The High Schools are independently managed by Escondido Union High School District (EUHSD).

Schools

Middle schools
Del Dios Academy of Arts and Sciences
Hidden Valley Middle School
Rincon Middle School
Quantum Academy
Mission Middle School
Bear Valley Middle School

Elementary schools
Bernardo Elementary School
Central Elementary School
Conway Elementary School
Farr Avenue Elementary School
Felicita Elementary School 
Glen View Elementary School
Juniper Elementary School
Lincoln Elementary School
L.R. Green Elementary School
Miller Elementary School
North Broadway Elementary School
Oak Hill Elementary School
Orange Glen Elementary School
Pioneer Elementary School
Reidy Creek Elementary School
Rock Springs Elementary School
Rose Elementary School

Specialty schools
Quantum Academy (4th–8th grade)

References

External links
 

School districts in San Diego County, California
Education in Escondido, California